This page details the match results and statistics of the Yemen national football team.

Key

Key to matches
Att.=Match attendance
(H)=Home ground
(A)=Away ground
(N)=Neutral ground

Key to record by opponent
Pld=Games played
W=Games won
D=Games drawn
L=Games lost
GF=Goals for
GA=Goals against

Results
Yemen's score is shown first in each case.

2020–29

2021

2022

2023

2010–19

2019

2018

2017

2016

2015

2014

2013

2012

2011

2010

2000–09

2009

Record by opponent

References

Yemen national football team results